Ibrahima Simang Sané (born 11 November 1989) is a Senegalese former professional footballer who played as a forward.

Career
Born in the Senegalese capital Dakar, Sané began to play in with Sporting Club de Dakar and moved in summer 2008 to France, who signed for Ligue 1 side US Boulogne and was loaned out to SC Toulon. He played alongside compatriots Zargo Touré - whom he lives with, and Mame N'Diaye, who was on loan from Marseille.

References

External links
 
 

Living people
1989 births
Footballers from Dakar
Association football forwards
Senegalese footballers
Ligue 2 players
Championnat National 2 players
US Boulogne players
SC Toulon players
Rodez AF players
Al-Hilal Club (Omdurman) players
Senegalese expatriate footballers
Senegalese expatriate sportspeople in France
Expatriate footballers in France
Senegalese expatriate sportspeople in Sudan
Expatriate footballers in Sudan